Trichomanes is a genus of ferns in the family Hymenophyllaceae, termed bristle ferns. The circumscription of the genus is disputed. All ferns in the genus are filmy ferns, with leaf tissue typically 2 cells thick.  This thinness generally necessitates a permanently humid habitat, and makes the fronds somewhat translucent. Because of this membrane-like frond tissue, the plant is prone to drying out. “Filmy ferns” in the taxa Hymenophyllaceae grow in constantly wet environments. Many are found in cloud forests such as “Choco” in Colombia. There are also members of the taxa that can grow submersed in water. 

The name bristle fern refers to the small bristle that protrudes from the indusia of these ferns.

Taxonomy
The genus Trichomanes was first described by Carl Linnaeus in 1753. Its status, like other genera in the subfamily Trichomanoideae, remains disputed. The Pteridophyte Phylogeny Group classification of 2016 (PPG I) accepts the genus as one of eight in the subfamily Trichomanoideae, saying that there are about 60 species. , the Checklist of Ferns and Lycophytes of the World listed about 70 species. Other sources, including Plants of the World Online , treated Trichomanes as the only genus in the subfamily Trichomanoideae, so that it included all the other genera, and had about 250 species.

Species
, the Checklist of Ferns and Lycophytes of the World accepted the following species:

Trichomanes accedens C.Presl
Trichomanes alatum Sw.
Trichomanes anadromum Rosenst.
Trichomanes ankersii Parker
Trichomanes anomalum Maxon & Morton
Trichomanes arbuscula Desv.
Trichomanes aureovestitum Proctor
Trichomanes bancroftii Hook. & Grev.
Trichomanes bicorne Hook.
Trichomanes bissei C.Sánchez
Trichomanes boivinii Bosch
Trichomanes botryoides Kaulf.
Trichomanes caliginum Lellinger
Trichomanes crassipilis Weath.
Trichomanes crinitum Sw.
Trichomanes crispiforme Alston
Trichomanes crispum L.
Trichomanes cristatum Kaulf.
Trichomanes cupressoides Desv.
Trichomanes dactylites Sodiro
Trichomanes delicatum Bosch
Trichomanes diversifrons (Bory) Mett.
Trichomanes ebiharae Fraser-Jenk. & Kholia
Trichomanes egleri P.G.Windisch
Trichomanes elegans Rich.
Trichomanes galeottii E.Fourn.
Trichomanes guidoi P.G.Windisch
Trichomanes holopterum Kunze
Trichomanes hostmannianum (Klotzsch) Kunze
Trichomanes humboldtii (Bosch) Lellinger
Trichomanes jenmanii Lellinger
Trichomanes kalbreyeri Baker
Trichomanes killipii Weath.
Trichomanes laciniosum Alston
Trichomanes lozanoi M.T.Murillo
Trichomanes lucens Sw.
Trichomanes ludovicianum Rosenst.
Trichomanes macilentum Bosch
Trichomanes madagascariense (Bosch) Moore
Trichomanes martiusii C.Presl
Trichomanes micayense Hieron.
Trichomanes mougeotii Bosch
Trichomanes murilloanum A.Rojas
Trichomanes osmundoides DC. ex Poir.
Trichomanes padronii Proctor
Trichomanes paucisorum R.C.Moran & B.Øllg.
Trichomanes pedicellatum Desv.
Trichomanes pellucens Kunze
Trichomanes pilosum Raddi
Trichomanes pinnatifidum Bosch
Trichomanes pinnatum Hedw.
Trichomanes plumosum Kunze
Trichomanes poeppigii C.Presl
Trichomanes polypodioides L.
Trichomanes procerum Fée
Trichomanes resinosum R.C.Moran
Trichomanes ribae Pacheco
Trichomanes robustum E.Fourn.
Trichomanes roraimense Jenman
Trichomanes scandens L.
Trichomanes sellowianum C.Presl
Trichomanes spruceanum Hook.
Trichomanes steyermarkii P.G.Windisch & A.R.Sm.
Trichomanes sublabiatum Bosch
Trichomanes superbum Bosch
Trichomanes tanaicum Hook.
Trichomanes trichopodium A.Rojas
Trichomanes trigonum Desv.
Trichomanes trollii Bergdolt
Trichomanes tuerckheimii Christ
Trichomanes vandenboschii P.G.Windisch
Trichomanes vaupesensis Lellinger
Trichomanes vittaria DC.

Species formerly placed in this genus include:

 Trichomanes angustatum Carmich. = Polyphlebium angustatum (Carmich.) Ebihara & Dubuisson
 Trichomanes bauerianum  = Callistopteris baueriana (Endl.) Copel – Bauer's bristle fern
 Trichomanes boryanum  = Cephalomanes atrovirens 
 Trichomanes boschianum  = Vandenboschia boschiana (J.W.Sturm ex Bosch) Ebihara & K.Iwats. – Appalachian bristle fern
 Trichomanes caudatum Brack. = Abrodictyum caudatum (Brack.) Ebihara & K.Iwats.
 Trichomanes intricatum  = Crepidomanes intricatum (Farrar) Ebihara & Weakley – Weft fern
 Trichomanes melanopus  = Didymoglossum melanopus (Baker) Copel. 
 Trichomanes petersii  = Didymoglossum petersii (A. Gray) Copel. – Dwarf bristle fern
 Trichomanes reniforme  = Hymenophyllum nephrophyllum Ebihara & K. Iwats.
 Trichomanes speciosum  = Vandenboschia speciosa (Willd.) G. Kunkel
 Trichomanes tenuissimum  = Polyphlebium tenuissimum (Bosch) comb. ined.
 Trichomanes venosum R.Br. = Polyphlebium venosum (R.Br.) Copel.

Phylogeny
Phylogeny by Fern Tree of Life.

References

Hymenophyllales
Fern genera
Taxonomy articles created by Polbot